Taj Kuh (also Romanized as Tāj Kūh) is a village in Zirkuh Rural District, Central District, Zirkuh County, South Khorasan Province, Iran. At the 2006 census, its population was 188, in 39 families.

References 

Populated places in Zirkuh County